Varshons II is the tenth studio album by American band The Lemonheads. It was released on February 8, 2019 through Fire Records.

It is the second cover album by The Lemonheads, with Varshons being released in 2009.

Track listing
Discography by Discogs, Rolling Stone, and AllMusic

Charts

References

2019 albums
The Lemonheads albums
Covers albums
Fire Records (UK) albums